GDE Bertoni is a trophy and medal manufacturer, in Milan, Italy. Until 1995, the company was known as 'Bertoni, Milano'.

The company's most famous production is the FIFA World Cup Trophy, which it made in 1971 after winning an international competition.

The firm's other notable works include the UEFA Champions League, UEFA Cup trophy, the UEFA Super Cup, the Olympic Order and Arabian Gulf Cup.

The company appeared on Inside Edition "How Do They Make the World Cup Trophy?" video in December 2022. The video amassed over 100,000 views in the span of 6 days.

References

External links 
 Official site

Award items
Manufacturing companies based in Milan